Jordan's Castle (Ulster Scots: Joardan's Kessel) is a castle situated in Ardglass, County Down, Northern Ireland. The tower house known as Jordan's Castle is a State Care Historic Monument sited in the townland of Ardglass, in the Newry, Mourne and Down District Council area, at grid ref: J5601 3713. It stands close to the junction of Kildare and Quay Streets in Ardglass and commands the harbour.

Features
The entrance is at the bottom of the north-west tower and leads to a spiral stairway to roof level. It is protected by a machicolation at that level. 

The Dublin Penny Journal of 30 March 1833 describes Jordan's Castle as follows:

History

It was also extensively used for get-togethers of the wide circle of Irish Cultural revival artists and writers to whom Bigger was friend and patron. Following suggestions by Alice Stopford Green and the archivist Henry Egan Kenny, Bigger renamed the tower "Castle Seán' in honour of the two years when Shane O'Neill (Seán Ó Néill) controlled Ardglass, and they believed, re-fortified the tower following his defeat of the MacDonnells at Glentaisie in 1565. The contents have since been dispersed among the Ulster Museums general collections and the tower is no longer open to the public.

Ardglass had at least six castles and remains of four of them can still be seen: Ardglass Castle, Cowd Castle, Margaret's Castle and Jordan's Castle.

See also 
Castles in Northern Ireland

References

External links
Environment and heritage Service – Jordan's Castle

Castles in County Down
Ruined castles in Northern Ireland
Ardglass
Northern Ireland Environment Agency properties
Tower houses in Northern Ireland